Gorges, the plural of the French word for "throat", usually refers to a canyon.

Gorges may also refer to:

Places
 Gorges, Loire-Atlantique, France
 Gorges, Manche, France
 Gorges, Somme, France
 Cognin-les-Gorges, Isère, France
 Three Gorges, a region in China
 Fort Gorges, a fort in Maine

People
 Gorges family, Anglo-Norman gentry family
 Ferdinando Gorges, founder of the Province of Maine
 Josh Gorges, an NHL ice hockey player
 Thomas Gorges (1536 – 30 March 1610), courtier to Queen Elizabeth I
 Thomas Gorges (Maine governor), deputy governor of colonial 17th century Maine

See also
 Julia Görges (born 1988), German tennis player
 Gorge (disambiguation)